Shree Hareshwar Education Society, is an education society based Karjule Hareshwar, Ahmednagar, Maharashtra, India. It provides education at Secondary and Higher Secondary level.

History
Shree Hareshwar Education Society was set up in 1978 by Vishnu Shinde with help of villagers of Karjule Hareshwar

Campuses and institutes

Karjule Hareshwar Campus
 Shree Hareshwar Vidyalaya.
 Shri Hareshwar Jr. College of Commerce

Khadkwadi Campus
 Nutan Madhyamik Vidyalaya
 Nutan Jr. College of Art and Science

Palashi Campus
 Malvir Vidyalaya

Kohkadi Campus
 Ratneshwar Vidyalaya

References 

Educational organisations in Maharashtra
1978 establishments in Maharashtra
Educational institutions established in 1978